The football competition at the 1985 Southeast Asian Games was held at the Suphachalasai Stadium in the National Sport Complex, Bangkok, Thailand. The matches were played from 8 to 18 December.

Medal winners

Men's tournament

Participants

Group stage

Group A

Group B

Knockout stages

Semi-finals

Third place match

Final

Winners

Medal winners

Women's tournament

Participants

Robin Round

Winners

References

BASOC (1985) 13th SEA Games Official Report, Thailand

1985 Southeast Asian Games
Football at the Southeast Asian Games
1985
Southeast
1985 in Thai sport